Deep Run is a tributary of Tohickon Creek which is located in Bedminster Township, Bucks County, Pennsylvania, in the United States.

History
Deep Run was so named by the first Irish settlers because it was deep compared to its width. The removal of trees at one time and erosion has lessened its depth. 

The Deep Run Mennonite Church and Deep Run Presbyterian Church are located in the Deep Run Valley. The Deep Run schoolhouse dates to 1746 when land was deeded to the Mennonites for this purpose, the structure was a log building. It was first used as a meeting house, then when a second structure was built as a meeting house, the first one became a schoolhouse. It was torn down in 1842. The second schoolhouse was built circa 1844. German was taught exclusively until 1850.

Statistics
Deep Run's GNIS identification number is 1173073, the Pennsylvania Gazatteer of Streams identification number is 03125.

Course
Deep Run rises just over a half mile south of Dublin west of Pennsylvania Route 313 (Dublin Pike) and is northeast oriented for a short distance where it turns northwest for about a mile, then turns again northeast until it meets with Tohickon Creek near Randts Mill, about a mile from Pipersville.

Geology
Appalachian Highlands Division
Piedmont Province
Gettysburg-Newark Lowland Section
Brunswick Formation
Deep Run lies in a band of the Brunswick Formation in the Newark basin formed during the Jurassic and Triassic. Consisting of mudstone, siltstone, reddish-brown shale and some green and some brown shale. Mineralogy includes argillite and hornfels.

Crossings

See also
List of rivers of the United States
List of rivers of Pennsylvania
List of Delaware River tributaries

References

Rivers of Pennsylvania
Rivers of Bucks County, Pennsylvania
Tributaries of Tohickon Creek